"I Don't Hurt Anymore" is a 1954 song by Hank Snow.  It was written by Don Robertson and Jack Rollins.

Prairie Oyster version

Canadian country music group Prairie Oyster covered the song on their album Different Kind of Fire. Their rendition went to number 70 on the Billboard Hot Country Singles chart in 1990, and also peaked at number 5 on RPM Country Tracks chart in Canada.

Chart performance

Year-end charts

Cover versions
Later in 1954, Dinah Washington reached number three on the R&B Best Seller charts with her version of the song.
Jerry Lee Lewis recorded it circa 1955 as a demo before he signed with Sun Records.
Eddie Fisher charted with this song in 1957.  Perhaps surprising to some Eddie actually scored strongly with a number of country tunes, including "Just a Little Lovin' (Will Go a Long Way)" and "Any Time".
Janis Martin recorded it on a 1957 EP.
Bill Haley & His Comets included the song on their album Haley's Juke Box (1960).
Hank Thompson recorded it on his Golden Country Hits album in 1964. His version of the song is featured on the fictional radio station Rebel Radio in Grand Theft Auto V.
Faron Young recorded it and Connie Francis did it on her country album in 1962.
Bob Dylan and The Band recorded the song in the 1967 sessions that would be known as The Basement Tapes.
Johnny Cash covered this song on his final album, American VI: Ain't No Grave.
Hank Snow covered himself by re-recording the song in stereo in the late 1950s or early 1960s.
Narvel Felts took a rendition to number 37 on the country charts in 1977.
Mandisa covered the Dinah Washington version of the song on the fifth season of American Idol.
Martina McBride recorded this song on her classic country covers album, Timeless.
Brighton, England-based indie pop duo, Love Tan, covered the song on their 2020 self-titled cassette.
Nancy And Beth (Megan Mullally and Stephanie Hunt band) recordered the song as single in 2019.

References

1954 songs
1954 singles
Hank Snow songs
Dinah Washington songs
Billboard Hot Country Songs number-one singles of the year
Songs written by Don Robertson (songwriter)
Prairie Oyster songs
Narvel Felts songs
Songs written by Walter E. "Jack" Rollins
1990 singles